Gujarati has a history of borrowing words from other languages it has encountered. It has had many borrowings from Persian, Arabic, and Portuguese. In recent times, English words have also been used. However, to the extent at which they have been, the majority is not considered as real loanwords and thus will not be included here. Other languages have been Turkish, French, Greek, and the neighboring languages of India.

Chinese

Portuguese

Marathi

Bengali

Kannada

English
{| class="wikitable sortable" width="100%" 
|-
! Gujarati Word !! Pronunciation !! English Word
|-
| કબાટ || kabaat || Cupboard
|-
| ટુવાલ || tuvaal || Towel
|-
| રસીદ || raseed || Receipt
|-
|મોબાઈલ|| mobile ||

Gujarati language
Gujarati